Barnet Trades Union Council (or 'Barnet TUC') is an association of trade union branches and individuals in north London, which describes itself as: 

Barnet TUC is affiliated to the Greater London Association of Trade Union Councils and the national Trades Union Congress. Founded in Barnet's industrial past, it folded during the deindustrialisation of the early 1990s, but reformed in 2008 in Hendon Town Hall.

Barnet TUC is group of people in the borough
of Barnet who support trade unions
and want to defend and improve
public services. Part of the structure
of the national Trades Union
Congress (TUC), the constitution
includes the aim:
“To improve generally the
economic and social conditions of
working people, including seeking
improvements to the social services,
public education, housing and health.”

Activities include sharing news
and ideas about trade union issues
and discussing wider questions
such as social justice and opposition
to racism and other forms of
discrimination.

Past Campaigns 

Since being reformed, it has campaigned on mainly local issues, but was also active over the Isle of Wight turbine factory closure.

The main issue since its relaunch has concerned the intention of the London Borough of Barnet to introduce a new model of local government delivery in the borough, called 'Future Shape', after commissioning a six-month external study. The first stages of 'Future Shape' were agreed by the council's cabinet in July 2009 The mainly public-sector union UNISON commissioned its own report on the issues involved in 'Future Shape'.

Barnet TUC has campaigned over the ending of full-time wardens at elderly peoples' accommodation, which has been an issue reported by the local media.

References

Organisations based in the London Borough of Barnet
Political organisations based in London
Trades councils